The 1927 Georgia Bulldogs football team represented the Georgia Bulldogs of the University of Georgia in the sport of American football during the 1927 Southern Conference football season. This was the last season George Cecil Woodruff served as the head coach of the football team and the team's 34th season of college football. The Bulldogs posted a 9–1 record, and were retroactively selected as the 1927 national champion under the Berryman QPRS, Boand, and Poling systems. The team was ranked No. 8 in the nation in the Dickinson System ratings released in December 1927.

Called the "dream and wonder team", the Bulldogs were ranked No. 1 in the US with one regular season game remaining, but were upset in the mud by in-state rival Georgia Tech (the next season's national champion). Georgia did not win the Southern Conference (SoCon) championship in 1927 as a result of its loss to Georgia Tech at season's end.  Georgia Tech (7–0–1 SoCon), Tennessee (5–0–1 SoCon), and NC State (4–0–0 SoCon) all finished undefeated in conference play.

The season featured Georgia's first-ever win against Yale as well as six shutouts. The win over Yale propelled Georgia to the national spotlight. The team was anchored by two All-American ends,  captain Chick Shiver and consensus All-American Tom Nash.

Preseason
At the end of last season, one source described Georgia as "probably the hardest hit team in the Southern Conference, losing 14 letter men with the Thanksgiving game."

Woodruff resignation
Coach Woodruff said he would quit after this season. Former Notre Dame back Jim Crowley and Notre Dame lineman Harry Mehre assisted Woodruff with his Notre Dame Box scheme.

Schedule

Season summary

Week 1: Virginia
To open the season, Herdis McCrary averaged a touchdown a quarter and the Bulldogs romped over the Virginia Cavaliers 32–0.

The starting lineup was: Nash (left end), Morris (left tackle), Jacobson (left guard), Boland (center), Smith (right guard), Stelling (right tackle), Shiver (right end), Broadnax (quarterback), Estes (left halfback), McTigue (right halfback), McCrary (fullback)

Week 2: at Yale

In the second week of play, Georgia defeated Yale by the score of 14–10, the school's first win over an Eastern power. Georgia was propelled into the national spotlight.  Bobby Hooks threw a 59-yard touchdown pass to Frank Dudley.

The starting lineup was: Nash (left end), Stelling (left tackle), Smith (left guard), Boland (center), Jacobson (right guard), Morris (right tackle), Shiver (right end), Broadnax (quarterback), Estes (left halfback), McTigue (right halfback), McCrary (fullback)

Week 3: Furman

Source:

Georgia defeated the Furman Purple Hurricane 32–0, giving the Purple Hurricane its only loss this season.  Furman twice was within Georgia's 5-yard line.

However, Georgia's backs also ran well. Frank Dudley had a 55-yard run for a score shortly after the start of the second quarter, and Roy Estes placed the ball in scoring position in the third with a 52-yard run.

The starting lineup was: Nash (left end), Morris (left tackle), Haley (left guard), Boland (center), Jacobson (right guard), Paitz (right tackle), Shiver (right end), Broadnax (quarterback), Estes (left halfback), McTigue (right halfback), McCrary (fullback).

Week 4: Auburn

Source:

In the fourth week of play, Georgia beat Auburn 33–0. Four touchdowns were scored in the second period, when coach Woodruff sent in his first-string backfield. A long pass from Hooks to McCrary got one touchdown.

The starting lineup was: Nash (left end), Morris (left tackle), Haley (left guard), Boland (center), Jacobson (right guard), Lautzenheizer (right tackle), Shiver (right end), Broadnax (quarterback), Estes (left halfback), Hooks (right halfback), McCrary (fullback).

Week 5: at Tulane
The Bulldogs traveled to New Orleans and beat Tulane 31–0. McCrary was kept on the bench as the halfbacks provided most of the scoring.

Week 6: at Florida

Georgia beat the Florida Gators 28–0 after leading just 7–0 at the half.  Florida quarterback Goof Bowyer broke his leg. The starting lineup was: Nash (left end), Morris (left tackle), Jacobson (left guard), Boland (center), Smith (right guard), Lautzenheizer (right tackle), Shiver (right end), Broadnax (quarterback), Estes (left halfback), McTigue (right halfback), Rothstein (fullback).

Week 7: Clemson

McCrary scored three of the five touchdowns in the 32–0 victory over Clemson.

McTigue ran in the first score. Roy Estes threw a 51-yard touchdown pass to H. F. Johnston. McCrary  replaced Rothstein and added two touchdowns. The second team went in the second half, in which McCrary added another touchdown.

The starting lineup was: Nash (left end), Morris (left tackle), Jacobson (left guard), Boland (center), Haley (right guard), Lautenheizer (right tackle), Shiver (right end), Broadnax (quarterback), Estes (left halfback), McTigue (right halfback), Rothstein (fullback).

Week 8: Mercer

Georgia started the Mercer game with its second string and won 26–7.  One report before the game reads: "Mercer's football team has about as much chance of beating Georgia as The Cluster has of having compulsory chapel abolished."

Mercer's Phoney Smith was the first southern player to cross the goal line against Georgia, on an 80-yard punt return.

Week 9: at Alabama

The game on November 24 against the Alabama Crimson Tide was the first game played in the newly completed Legion Field. The 20–7 Bulldog victory snapped a five-game losing streak against Alabama.

Estes passed to Nash for the first score, and Estes ran the second score in himself. Another pass to Nash got a touchdown in the third quarter. In the final period, Alabama's Brasfield went back to pass, but saw no one open, and took off running. In the game's most sensational play, he dodged three tacklers behind the line, and evaded three more on his way to the endzone.

The starting lineup was: Nash (left end), Morris (left tackle), C. Smith (left guard), Boland (center), Jacobson (right guard), Lautenheizer (right tackle), Shiver (right end), Johnson (quarterback), McTigue (left halfback), Estes (right halfback), Hill (fullback).

Week 10: at Georgia Tech

Sources:

Georgia was ranked number 1 by the Dickinson system. Grant Field was expected to be filled to capacity, the largest crowd ever in the south. One account read "And never in the history of athletics in the Southland has there been an occasion so momentous as this. The football championship of the South and as some may justifiably figure, the nation, will be decided on Saturday in the capital city and native sons will decide it."

In the rain, the Bulldogs were defeated by rival Georgia Tech for the SoCon championship 12–0. For the first time this year, neither Nash nor Shiver played particularly well.

Tech's first touchdown came on a pass from Warner Mizell to quarterback Bob Durant. The second one came shortly after Stumpy Thomason returned an interception 57 yards to Georgia's 22-yard line. Thomason scored on a 13-yard end run.

The starting lineup was: Nash (left end), Morris (left tackle), Jacobson (left guard), Boland (center), Smith (right guard), Lautenheizer (right tackle), Shiver (right end), Johnson (quarterback), Estes (left halfback), Dudley (right halfback), McCrary (fullback).

Postseason

Legacy
By season's end, both Georgia and Yale were national champions according to various selectors. Despite the loss to Tech, the Bulldogs were  retroactively selected as the 1927 national champion under the Boand, Poling, and Berryman QPRS systems. Walter Eckersall noted the progress of southern football as he reflected on Georgia's victory over Yale; "Old Eli, with its running attack, could do nothing against Georgia, which is represented by two of the finest ends in the country. Nash and Shiver would be valuable assets on any football team."

Players

Depth chart
The following chart provides a visual depiction of Georgia's lineup during the 1927 season with games started at the position reflected in parenthesis. The chart mimics a Notre Dame Box on offense.

Line

Backfield

Unlisted

Staff
Head coach: Kid Woodruff
Manager: Keith Lewis, James M. Roberts

See also
1927 College Football All-America Team
1927 College Football All-Southern Team

Notes

References

Additional sources
 

Georgia
Georgia Bulldogs football seasons
College football national champions
Georgia Bulldogs football